Roast Fish Collie Weed & Corn Bread is a studio album by Lee Perry, released in 1978. Although Perry had been in the Jamaican music business for a long time by 1978, this album, produced by himself at his Black Ark studio, was the first to consist entirely of songs sung by himself. The album is very experimental.

Island Records, that had released earlier Lee Perry productions like Super Ape and War Ina Babylon, rejected the album. This angered Perry and his relationship with the record company got worse.

Track listing

Side one
"Soul Fire"
"Throw Some Water In"
"Evil Tongues"
"Curly Locks"
"Ghetto Sidewalk "

Side two
"Favourite Dish"
"Big Neck Police"
"Free Up the Weed"
"Mr. D.J. Man" AKA "Yu Squeeze Ma Panhandle"
"Roast Fish & Cornbread"

Personnel
Lee Perry – vocals, percussion
Geoffrey Chung – guitar
Earl "Chinna" Smith – guitar
Billy Boy – guitar
Winston Wright – organ
Boris Gardiner – bass
Michael "Mickey Boo" Richards – drums
Sly Dunbar – drums
Noel "Skully" Simms – percussion
Full Experience – background vocals

References

1978 albums
Lee "Scratch" Perry albums
Albums produced by Lee "Scratch" Perry